UK Music is a British umbrella organisation which represents the collective interests of the production side of UK's commercial music industry: artists, musicians, songwriters, composers, record labels, artist managers, music publishers, studio producers and music collecting societies.

History

Launched on 26 September 2008, Feargal Sharkey, former member of The Undertones, became chief executive officer (CEO) and Andy Heath, former chairman of British Music Rights, became chairman.

Sharkey left the organisation in November 2011, with Jo Dipple taking over as acting CEO. UK Music confirmed on 27 January 2012 the appointment of Dipple as the next CEO.

In January 2017, the organisation announced that Dipple would stand down as its CEO in June 2017. In April 2017, former Labour Party MP and Shadow Cabinet member Michael Dugher was announced as Dipple's replacement. Dugher took over as CEO of UK Music in May 2017. 

In December 2019 Michael Dugher announced he would stepping down as CEO. Deputy CEO Tom Kiehl took over as acting CEO in February 2020. Former Labour Party Deputy Leader Tom Watson took over as chair, replacing Andy Heath, in April 2020. Jamie Njoku-Goodwin took over as CEO of UK Music in October 2020.

Sound Rights

In December 2008, UK Music launched Sound Rights, a free online resource for teachers and schools to support music study in schools. This was aimed at supporting the study of "the role of music and musicians in society, the music industry and of artistic and intellectual property rights.”  In an interview with ISP Review in January 2009, UK Music Press Officer Adam Webb outlined the organisation's plans for tackling the problems of illegal file sharing over the internet and building working relationships with Internet Service Providers.

References

British music industry
2008 establishments in the United Kingdom
Organizations established in 2008
Cultural organisations based in London
Arts and media trade groups